The 2008 Girabola was the 30th season of the top-tier football league in Angola. The season ran from 2 March to 2 November 2008. Interclube were the defending champions.

The league comprised 14 teams and the bottom three were relegated to the 2009 Gira Angola.

Petro Atlético de Luanda were crowned champions, while Benfica do Lubango, Petro do Huambo and Sagrada Esperança were relegated. Santana Carlos of Petro Luanda finished as top scorer with 20 goals.

FAF penalties
On its official weekly report 0032/SG/08, F.C. Bravos do Maquis forfeited 3 points regarding their 15 round home match against Primeiro de Maio.

Changes from the 2007 season
Relegated: Académica do Soyo, Atlético do Namibe, Juventude do Moxico 
Promoted: Bravos do Maquis, Kabuscorp, Recreativo do Libolo

League table

Results

Season statistics

Top scorers

Pokers & Hat-tricks

References

External links
Girabola 2008 standings at girabola.com
Federação Angolana de Futebol

2008 in Angolan football
Girabola seasons
Angola
Angola